Walter Sachs (b. October 23, 1892 - d. October 6, 1946) is a former German ice hockey player. Sachs played on the Germany men's national ice hockey team at the 1928 Winter Olympics.

References

External links

Olympic profile

1892 births
1946 deaths
Ice hockey people from Berlin
Ice hockey players at the 1928 Winter Olympics
Olympic ice hockey players of Germany
People from Berlin